Patrick Merrill (born February 22, 1979) is a former Canadian professional lacrosse player for the Toronto Rock in the National Lacrosse League and of the Toronto Nationals in Major League Lacrosse. He is currently the Head Coach and General Manager of the San Diego Seals.

Professional career
Merrill was a first-round draft choice of the Toronto Rock in 2002, and after four seasons with the Rock, was chosen first overall by the Boston Blazers in the 2008 expansion draft. However, following the cancellation and subsequent reinstatement of the 2008 season, the Blazers, along with the Arizona Sting, announced that they would not participate in the 2008 season. A dispersal draft was held, and Merrill was chosen second overall by the Titans.

Merrill's brother Brodie Merrill also plays in the NLL for the San Diego Seals.

Player Statistics

NLL
Reference:

MLL 
Reference:

MSL 
Reference:

Coaching Statistics

NLL

OJLL 
Reference:

References

1979 births
Living people
Anglophone Quebec people
Canadian lacrosse players
New York Titans (lacrosse) players
Orlando Titans players
Sportspeople from Montreal
Hamilton Nationals players
Toronto Rock players